The Kings Arms is a pub at 110 Uxbridge Road, Hanwell, London W7 3SU.

It is on the Campaign for Real Ale's National Inventory of Historic Pub Interiors.

The pub was rebuilt in 1930 by the brewers Mann, Crossman & Paulin, and the original interior remains largely intact.

References

Pubs in the London Borough of Ealing
National Inventory Pubs
Hanwell